Loricariichthys nudirostris is a species of catfish in the family Loricariidae. It is endemic to Brazil, where it occurs in the Amazon River basin. The species reaches  in standard length, can weigh up to at least , and is believed to be a facultative air-breather.

References 

Loricariini
Fish of Brazil
Endemic fauna of Brazil